Below are the team rosters for the softball competition at the 2022 World Games.

Rosters

Australia
The roster was released on May 10, 2022.

Michelle Cox
Georgia Hood
Shannon Keevers
Olivia Kuzminski
Kandra Lamb
Chantelle Ladner
Stacey McManus
Ellen Roberts
Steph Trzcisnki
Taylah Tsitsikronis
Jade Wall
Clare Warwick
Belinda White
Tameika Whitefield
Sasha Willems

Canada
The roster was released on June 21, 2022.

Ruby Anderson
Dawn Bodrug
Emma Entzminger
Alysen Febrey
Larissa Franklin
Kelsey Harshman
Victoria Hayward
Kianna Jones
Kelsey Lalor
Janet Leung
Grace Messmer
Erika Polidori
Morgan Rackel
Nicola Simpson
Natalie Wideman

Chinese Taipei
The roster was released on June 16, 2022.

Chiang Hui-chuan
Shen Xiao-Lin
Chiu An-Ju
Yang Yi-Ting
Li Szu-Shih
Lin Feng-Chen
Shen Chia-Wen
Chen Chia-Yi
Shih Chia-Ching
Lin Chih-Ying
Tsai Chia-Chen
Liu Huan
Tan Ya-ting
Weng Tzu-Ching
Chen Yu-Ting
Ko Chia-Hui
Chang Chia-Yun
Chen Ching-Yu
Chih I-Ting
Chiang Ting-En
Ke Hsia-Ai
Ho Yi-Fan

Italy
The roster was released on February 15, 2022.

Laura Bigatton
Ilaria Cacciamani
Elisa Cecchetti
Irene Costa
Sofia Fabbian
Amanda Fama
Andrea Filler
Agnese Giacometti
Noemi Giacometti
Giulia Longhi
Fabrizia Marrone
Alessia Melegari
Alice Nicolini
Carlotta Salis
Melany Sheldon
Elena Slawitz
Silvia Torre

Japan
The roster was released on June 21, 2022.

Haruka Agatsuma
Urara Fujimoto
Yamato Fujita
Miu Goto
Nodoka Harada
Yuka Ichiguchi
Kyoko Ishikawa
Misaki Katsumata
Hitomi Kawabata
Yume Kiriishi
Kanna Kudo
Sakura Miwa
Minori Naito
Ayane Nakagawa
Yui Sakamoto

Mexico
The roster was released on June 21, 2022.

Stefanía Aradillas
Diana Arcega
Alex Casas
Saleen Donohoe
Marlene Espinoza
Kiana Estrada
Desiree Denise Hernandez
Sierra Hyland
Raci Cian Miranda Weeks
Valeria Pero
Ximena Piri
Gloria Ponce
Madelyn Ruffin
Yanina Treviño
Savannah Wysocki

Puerto Rico
The roster was released on June 21, 2022.

Karla Claudio
Esperanza Coe
Jenna Cozza
Xeana Dung
Kathyria Garcia
Carsyn Gordon
Jaimie Hoover
Janelle Martinez
Aleshia Ocasio
Camille Nahir Ortiz Martinez
Shasl Yanne Ortiz Sterling
Alyssa Rivera
Daniele Nicole Rivera
Tatianna Roman
Geana Jene Torres

United States
The roster was released on January 7, 2022.

Monica Abbott
Ally Carda
Charla Echols
Megan Faraimo
Hannah Flippen
Jailyn Ford
Montana Fouts
Kinzie Hansen
Janae Jefferson
Amanda Lorenz
Haylie McCleney
Michelle Moultrie
Dejah Mulipola
Bubba Nickles
Taylor Pleasants
Sami Reynolds
Gwen Svekis

References

Softball at the 2022 World Games